York is a city in and the county seat of York County, Nebraska, United States. At the 2010 census, the city population was 7,766.  It is the home of York College and the Nebraska Correctional Center for Women.

History
York was platted in 1869. The city took its name from York County.

In 1920, the Nebraska legislature established the State Reformatory for Women in York.  The facility was expanded over the years; as of 2017, it operated as the Nebraska Correctional Center for Women, with a rated capacity of 275 beds.

Geography
York is located in  (40.867295, -97.588869). The city sits at the crossroads of Interstate 80, a major east–west highway, and U.S. Route 81, a major north–south highway.

Climate

According to the Köppen Climate Classification system, York has a hot-summer humid continental climate, abbreviated "Dfa" on climate maps.

Demographics

2010 census
As of the census of 2010, there were 7,766 people, 3,253 households, and 1,992 families living in the city. The racial makeup of the city was 94.9% White, 1.0% African American, 0.3% Native American, 0.7% Asian, 0.1% Pacific Islander, 1.8% from other races, and 1.2% from two or more races. Hispanic or Latino of any race were 4.4% of the population.

There were 3,253 households, of which 27.4% had children under the age of 18 living with them, 49.4% were married couples living together, 8.4% had a female householder with no husband present, 3.4% had a male householder with no wife present, and 38.8% were non-families. 33.4% of all households were made up of individuals, and 15.4% had someone living alone who was 65 years of age or older. The average household size was 2.26 and the average family size was 2.87.

The median age in the city was 39.4 years. 22.9% of residents were under the age of 18; 11.3% were between the ages of 18 and 24; 21.9% were from 25 to 44; 25.7% were from 45 to 64; and 18.2% were 65 years of age or older. The gender makeup of the city was 49.0% male and 51.0% female.

2000 census
As of the census of 2000, there were 8,081 people, 3,304 households, and 2,101 families living in the city. The population density was 1,433.6 people per square mile (553.2/km). There were 3,532 housing units at an average density of 626.6 per square mile (241.8/km). The racial makeup of the city was 96.76% White, 0.74% African American, 0.15% Native American, 0.74% Asian, 0.11% Pacific Islander, 0.58% from other races, and 0.92% from two or more races. Hispanic or Latino of any race were 1.56% of the population.

There were 3,304 households, out of which 29.0% had children under the age of 18 living with them, 53.3% were married couples living together, 7.8% had a female householder with no husband present, and 36.4% were non-families. 31.5% of all households were made up of individuals, and 16.4% had someone living alone who was 65 years of age or older. The average household size was 2.31 and the average family size was 2.90.

In the city, the population was spread out, with 23.7% under the age of 18, 11.7% from 18 to 24, 24.0% from 25 to 44, 22.4% from 45 to 64, and 18.2% who were 65 years of age or older. The median age was 38 years. For every 100 females, there were 90.1 males. For every 100 females age 18 and over, there were 86.6 males.

As of 2000 the median income for a household in the city was $36,069, and the median income for a family was $45,544. Males had a median income of $31,014 versus $20,086 for females. The per capita income for the city was $17,813. About 6.3% of families and 9.2% of the population were below the poverty line, including 9.1% of those under age 18 and 8.1% of those age 65 or over.

Culture

The Art Deco York Auditorium (1940) was designed by Meginnis and Schaumberg.

Education
York Public Schools are part of the York Public Schools School District. Schools in the district include York Elementary School, York Middle School and York High School.

York has two parochial schools.  Emmanuel-Faith Lutheran School opened in 1957.  The pre-school is located at Faith Lutheran Church in York, while grades K-8 are located in a school attached to Emmanuel Lutheran Church.  St. Joseph Catholic School, opened in 1890, educates children grades PK-8.

York College is a private college affiliated with the Churches of Christ and located in York, Nebraska. It was founded in 1890.

Media
York fielded a number of newspapers in the 1800s.  On January 1, 1883, the York Democrat was created from a previous paper, the York Tribune.  The York Republican was another newspaper that flourished during this time and was notable for its large circulation.  York's current newspaper is the York News-Times.

York has two radio stations that have been locally owned since they went on the air in 1954: KAWL (AM 1370) and KTMX (FM 1970), providing news, sports, music and entertainment to York and adjacent counties.

Notable people
 Doug Bereuter - U.S. Representative from Nebraska, 1979–2004
 David Erb - jockey, won 1956 Kentucky Derby and Belmont Stakes
 Catherine Fenselau - educator
 Loyd Jones - inventor, Head of Physics for Eastman Kodak Company, Rochester, NY  1912-1954
 Sam Koch - NFL punter for the Baltimore Ravens
 Logan Lynn - musician, television personality and LGBT activist
 Fred Niblo - silent era film director
 Shirley Ross (born Bernice M. Gaunt) - singer, actor
 Tom Sieckmann - professional golfer

References

External links

 York News-Times, local news

Cities in York County, Nebraska
Cities in Nebraska
County seats in Nebraska